Henry M. "Hank" Ferris is a former American football coach.  He served as the head football coach at the Montclair State University in Upper Montclair, New Jersey from 1966 to 1968, compiling a record of 9–17.

Head coaching record

References

Year of birth missing (living people)
Living people
Montclair State Red Hawks football coaches